The Council of Ministers (1967–69) of Legislative Assembly, Kerala state (better known as E. M. S. Namboodiripad ministry – second term) was the Council of Ministers, the executive wing of state government, in the Indian state of Kerala. The ministry was led (Chief Minister) by Communist Party of India (Marxist) leader E. M. S. Namboodiripad from 6 March 1967 to 1 November 1969 and had thirteen ministries.

Council of Ministers

See also
 Saptakakshi Munnani

References

 https://web.archive.org/web/20160708185932/http://www.prd.kerala.gov.in/ministers49_main.htm

Namboodiripad 02
Communist Party of India (Marxist) state ministries
1967 establishments in Kerala
1969 disestablishments in India
Cabinets established in 1967
Cabinets disestablished in 1969